Maulvi Gul Zarin Kochi is an Afghan Taliban politician who is currently serving as Deputy Ministry of Borders and Tribal Affairs since 23 November 2021 alongside Haji Gul Mohammad and Ahmad Taha. He is also serving as the director of the Independent General Directorate of Kochi (nomad).

References

Living people
Taliban government ministers of Afghanistan
Year of birth missing (living people)